Belgica antarctica, the Antarctic midge, is a species of flightless midge, endemic to the continent of Antarctica.
It also has the smallest known insect genome as of 2014, with only 99 million base pairs of nucleotides and about  genes. It is the only insect that can survive year-round in Antarctica.

Tolerance to extreme conditions
The flightlessness of B. antarctica may be an adaptation to prevent wind from blowing it into inhospitable areas. It can survive freezing, but though local air temperatures may reach as low as −40 °C, this insect cannot survive temperatures below −15 °C. This is comparatively milder than other cold-adapted insects. The reason for this relatively low freezing tolerance is due to thermal buffering: just burrowing at a depth of 1 cm, temperature is stable between 0 and −2 °C for 10 months out of 12, and it seldom goes lower than −7 °C all year round. Ice and snow cover also helps keep the temperature stable. Freezing tolerance is enhanced by cold hardening.

To adapt to the cold temperatures, B. antarctica accumulates trehalose, glucose, and erythritol. These compounds help the insect survive freezing by reducing the amount of ice that forms within the body. They also stabilize proteins and membranes, binding to them by means of hydrogen bonds. Heat shock proteins also help the tolerance to both high and low temperatures.

B. antarctica not only tolerates, but also requires a freezing climate to survive: exposure of larvae to such mild temperatures as 10 °C is enough to kill them within a week. Exposure to temperatures of 30 °C kills individuals in a few hours. It can, however, resist partial desiccation, surviving the loss of up to 70% of body water.

Lifecycle
B. antarctica spends most of its two-year lifecycle in four larval stages. Overwintering may occur in any instar. Terrestrial algae (particularly Prasiola crispa), moss, organic detritus, and microorganisms provide the food for the larval stage. The adults emerge in the spring and summer and live no more than 10 days; females mate in their first day of life and a few days later release eggs. The female secretes a jelly on the eggs that acts as a blanket of antifreeze, stops them from dehydrating, and acts as a food source once they hatch.
Mating occurs in large groups of males, analogous to swarms of winged midges.

Genome
As of 2014, B. antarctica has the smallest insect genome known, at 99 Mbp and 13 500 genes. Although the total amount of coding DNA is similar to that of other Diptera (19 Mbp), its fraction is much higher due to the extreme reduction in some types of non-coding DNA. Intron size has been reduced, while transposable elements are almost absent.

See also
 Gynaephora groenlandica, a species of Arctic moth whose larvae can survive temperatures below –60 °C
 Belgian Antarctic Expedition

References

Further reading

External links

 Other bugs that live in Antarctica  Archived 

Fauna of Antarctica
Insects described in 1900
A
Insects of Antarctica
Wingless Diptera
Taxa named by Jean-Charles Jacobs